Walnut Township is a township in Wayne County, Iowa, USA.

History
Walnut Township was named from Walnut Creek.

References

Townships in Wayne County, Iowa
Townships in Iowa